North Carolina Highway 198 (NC 198) is a primary state highway in the U.S. state of North Carolina. It connects the town of Earl with the rest of Cleveland County.

Route description
A two-lane rural highway, it traverses , starting at the South Carolina state line at Buffalo Creek, through the town of Earl, ending at NC 180, south of Patterson Springs.

History
Established in 1952, the route has not changed since.

Junction list

References

External links

198
Transportation in Cleveland County, North Carolina